Allhallows is a civil parish in the Allerdale district of Cumbria, England.  It has a population of 548 (2001 census), reducing slightly to 546 at the 2011 Census.  The parish includes the hamlets of Baggrow, Harbybrow, Watchhill, and Fletchertown.

See also

Listed buildings in Allhallows, Cumbria

References

External links

  Cumbria County History Trust: Allhallows (nb: provisional research only)
 Allhallows Parish Council
 Allhallows Community Centre

Civil parishes in Cumbria
Allerdale